The New South Wales Minister for Regional Youth is a minister in the New South Wales Government with responsibility for providing a whole-of-government approach to regional youth issues in New South Wales, Australia.

It was first established in 1956 as the Minister for Child Welfare in the third ministry of Joe Cahill, with the principal responsibility being the care of neglected, orphaned and delinquent children through the Child welfare department. The department had existed since 1881 initially under the Colonial Secretary. The portfolio was held in conjunction with that of Social Welfare until 1973 when they were combined as the portfolio of Youth and Community Services. Youth Affairs were part of the responsibilities of the Minister for Education from 1988 until 1995 when a separate portfolio was re-created as the Minister Assisting the Premier on Youth Affairs. The Youth portfolio was abolished in 2011 and re-established as Regional Youth in 2019.

The current Minister for Regional Youth is Ben Franklin, since December 2021. Franklin also serves as the Minister for Aboriginal Affairs and Minister for the Arts, also with effect from December 2021. The minister administers the portfolio through the Regional NSW cluster, including the Office for Regional Youth and assists the Minister for Families, Communities and Disability Services.

In the second Perrottet ministry there are four other ministers with specific regional responsibility:
 Minister for Regional New South Wales, Paul Toole
 Minister for Regional Health, Bronnie Taylor
 Minister for Regional Transport and Roads, Sam Farraway
 Minister for Western New South Wales, Dugald Saunders.

Ultimately the minister is responsible to the Parliament of New South Wales.

List of ministers 
The following individuals have been appointed Minister for Regional Youth or any precedent titles:

Former ministerial titles

References

Regional Youth